The 11th CARIFTA Games was held in Kingston, Jamaica on April 10–12, 1982.

Participation (unofficial)

Detailed result lists can be found on the "World Junior Athletics History" website.  An unofficial count yields the number of about 154 athletes (112 junior (under-20) and 42 youth (under-17)) from about 15 countries:  Antigua and Barbuda (4), Bahamas (39), Bermuda (10), British Virgin Islands (2), Cayman Islands (5), Grenada (3), Guadeloupe (9), Guyana (2), Jamaica (45), Martinique (5), Saint Vincent and the Grenadines (2), Trinidad and Tobago (11), Turks and Caicos Islands (2).

Austin Sealy Award

The Austin Sealy Trophy for the most outstanding athlete of the games was awardeded to Laverne Eve from the Bahamas.  She won 3 gold medals (shot put, discus throw, and javelin throw) in the junior (U-20) category.

Medal summary

Medal winners are published by category: Boys under 20 (Junior), Girls under 20 (Junior), Boys under 17 (Youth), and Girls under 17 (Youth).
Complete results can be found on the "World Junior Athletics History" website.

Boys under 20 (Junior)

Girls under 20 (Junior)

Boys under 17 (Youth)

Girls under 17 (Youth)

Medal table (unofficial)

References

External links
World Junior Athletics History

CARIFTA Games
CARIFTA
1982 in Jamaican sport
1982 in Caribbean sport
International athletics competitions hosted by Jamaica